David W. Boots (born November 18, 1955) is an American retired basketball coach. He was the former head coach of the University of South Dakota men's basketball team. Boots played at Division III Augsburg College and later coached there. He was named head coach of South Dakota in 1988. Boots retired as head coach in September 2013. He finished as the winningest coach in school history with a record of 503–235.

Head coaching record

References

1955 births
Living people
American men's basketball coaches
Augsburg Auggies men's basketball coaches
Augsburg Auggies men's basketball players
College men's basketball head coaches in the United States
South Dakota Coyotes men's basketball coaches
American men's basketball players